Magorra is a town and a nagar panchayat in the Mathura district of the Indian state of Uttar Pradesh.

History
Magorra in present is a historical village (presently a town) near Saunkh.
You will be amazed to know the fact; this village has been registered in Hindi literature by a young author Varun Chaudhary antriksh in his book "KUMBH MELA: ek doctor ki yatra" (I.S.B.N. 978-93-82937-11-1) . This travelogue is published by nikhil publishers & distributors, agra (contact number of publisher are 05623273188, 08979834445) . Page number 149 of first edition of this book has a clause which depicts the name of village 'Magorra' .

References

Cities and towns in Mathura district